Dallas Neil (born September 30, 1976 in Great Falls, Montana) is a former American football punter and tight end for the Atlanta Falcons and the New York Jets. Neil was the starting quarter back for his high school football team, Great Falls High School; cross town rivals to CMR High School, and CMR's starting quarterback at the time, Ryan Leaf. Neal went to college at the University of Montana where he played with the Montana Grizzlies football team as both a tight end and punter. He completed his master's degree in May 2000, and founded a business, Kinetic Sports Interactive.

After going undrafted in the 2000 NFL Draft, Neil was signed by the Atlanta Falcons. He played 6 games behind Dan Stryzinski at punter, and dealt with injury problems for some of the season. In 2001, he was released and then signed to the Falcons practice squad. He was then re-signed to the regular roster on January 10, 2002. However, in a pre-season game Neil injured his ankle and was placed on Injured Reserve on August 27, 2002. In  2003 Neil became a free agent before signing with the New York Jets. He was waived in early 2004, ending his NFL career.

1976 births
Living people
Sportspeople from Great Falls, Montana
American football punters
American football tight ends
Montana Grizzlies football players
Atlanta Falcons players
New York Jets players
Players of American football from Montana